Graniteville is an unincorporated community in northeast Iron County, in the U.S. state of Missouri. The community is located on Missouri Route 21 approximately three-quarters of a mile east of Elephant Rocks State Park. Pilot Knob is about three miles to the southeast.

History
A post office called Graniteville was established in 1874, and remained in operation until 1913. The community was named for granite quarrying near the original town site.

Notable person
Tim McCabe, a Major League Baseball pitcher, was born at Graniteville in 1894.

References

Unincorporated communities in Iron County, Missouri
Unincorporated communities in Missouri